Stretton Baskerville is a deserted medieval village and civil parish in the English county of Warwickshire. It shares a parish council with the nearby parish of Burton Hastings. Stretton means "settlement on a Roman Road" (from the Old English stræt and tun). In this case the road is Watling Street.

External links
Management Objectives relating to Medieval Village of Stretton Baskerville

Deserted medieval villages in Warwickshire
Civil parishes in Warwickshire